Musikili Primary School is a private boarding school in Zambia for boys and girls from grade 1 to grade 7.

Notes and references 
 
 

Boarding schools in Zambia
Mazabuka District
Buildings and structures in Southern Province, Zambia
Private schools in Zambia
Primary schools in Zambia